Torsten Traub (born 8 September 1975) is a German former professional footballer who played as a defender.

Career
Traub made his professional debut for SSV Reutlingen in the 2. Bundesliga on 13 August 2000, starting in the match against Mainz 05, where he scored in the 56th minute to level the score 2–2 for Reutlingen. The match finished as a 3–2 home win.

References

External links
 
 

1975 births
Living people
People from Reutlingen (district)
Sportspeople from Tübingen (region)
Footballers from Baden-Württemberg
German footballers
Association football defenders
SSV Reutlingen 05 players
FC St. Pauli players
FC Rot-Weiß Erfurt players
FC Augsburg players
FC Augsburg II players
VfR Aalen players
Stuttgarter Kickers players
2. Bundesliga players
3. Liga players
Regionalliga players